John Brendan Kelly Sr. (October 4, 1889 – June 20, 1960) was an American triple Olympic champion, the first in the sport of rowing. The Philadelphia-based Kelly also was a multimillionaire in the bricklaying and construction industry. He also was involved in politics, serving as Pennsylvania secretary of revenue and running unsuccessfully for mayor of Philadelphia in the 1935 Philadelphia mayoral election. 

Kelly was the father of actress Grace Kelly, Princess of Monaco (thus maternal grandfather of Albert II, Prince of Monaco), and of Jack Kelly Jr., an accomplished rower who served as president of the U.S. Olympic Committee.

Early life

Kelly was born in Philadelphia, one of 10 children of Irish immigrants John Henry Kelly (1847–1917), who emigrated from his homestead near Newport, County Mayo, in 1869, and Mary Ann Costello (1852–1926), who arrived in the U.S. in 1867. He attended public schools and at night attended the Spring Garden Institute.

In 1907, he began bricklaying in Philadelphia as an apprentice at his brother Patrick's construction firm. Standing 6'2", he was a gifted athlete and competed in football and basketball in addition to rowing, which he learned on the Schuylkill River. By 1916, Kelly was a national rowing champion and the best sculler in the United States. As part of the World War I callup, Kelly joined the United States Army as a private in October 1917. He rose to the rank of lieutenant by the time he was discharged in April 1919. While in the Army, Kelly entered the armed forces boxing tournament as a heavyweight and ran up a 12–0 record before being waylaid by a broken ankle. Future world professional boxing champion Gene Tunney won the tournament. In later years, Kelly would kid Tunney: "Aren't you lucky I broke my ankle?"

Following his Army discharge in 1919, Kelly continued his dominance in the single scull. He also started a brickwork contracting company in Philadelphia, John B. Kelly, Inc, with a $7,000 loan from his brothers George, a future Pulitzer Prize-winning playwright, and Walter, who was a popular vaudeville actor. A self-promoter, Kelly coined the slogan "Kelly for Brickwork", which was often seen at local construction sites.

Kelly developed a technique to ensure payment for his brickwork from less-than-trustworthy real estate developers. Kelly's crews would mortar a single pane of glass into each chimney they built. When new home owners would complain to realtors about smoke backing into their houses from the fireplaces, and the developers would then complain to Kelly, he would reply, "I'll take care of it when your check clears." Once paid, Kelly would send crews out to drop a brick down each chimney they'd constructed, smashing the glass panes and solving the problem.

In 1919, Kelly played professional football for the Holmesburg Athletic Club. The team would go on to win the 1919 and 1920 Philadelphia City Championship. In a 1919 game against a team from Camden, New Jersey, Kelly scored three touchdowns in just the first quarter of the game.

Rowing career
Kelly won 126 straight races in the single scull in 1919 and 1920, a six-time U.S. national champion who was one of the most popular figures in the sport.

Rejection by the Henley Royal Regatta 
In 1920, amid his winning streak, Kelly applied to race in the Diamond Sculls at the Henley Royal Regatta. Held annually on the River Thames in Henley, England, it was the most prestigious event in rowing. But the event's organizers rejected his application, citing an earlier dispute with his rowing club and the fact that he had worked as a manual laborer. 

The minutes of the regatta's Committee of Management for June 3, 1920, read: "The list of entries ... outside of the United Kingdom under Rule iv was presented ... and received with the exception of Mr J.B. Kelly of the Vesper Boat Club to compete in the Diamond Sculls, which was refused under the resolution passed by the Committee on 7th June, 1906 'viz' 'That no entry from the Vesper Boat Club of Philadelphia, or from any member of their 1905 crew be accepted in future': Mr Kelly was also not qualified under Rule I (e) of the General Rules (manual labour)."

That 1906 resolution banned members of the Vesper Boat Club from the event because their eight-man team in the Grand Challenge Cup had used a public subscription to raise the money to travel to London, breaching the regatta's rule on amateurism. 

The regatta committee's minutes also note that they rejected Kelly because he had worked as a bricklayer. The regatta's rules on amateurism excluded anyone "who is or ever has been...by trade or employment for wages a mechanic, artisan or labourer." Two days before Kelly was due to sail to the UK, with his passage booked and his boat boxed, he received a telegram which said: "Entry rejected; letter follows." He never received the letter. The Henley Stewards later declared that they had informed the governing board for U.S. rowing as soon as Kelly's entry was processed, and that it was not their fault if the information was not passed on.

The affair was widely reported, especially in London, New York and Philadelphia. The Stewards of Henley Royal Regatta came in for heavy criticism. One interpretation was that they had excluded Kelly because they did not want an American to win the Diamonds. The publicity made Kelly widely popular and would later help his bricklaying business. The ban on Vesper Boat Club was rescinded soon afterward and in 1937 the references in the Henley rules excluding manual labourers, mechanics, artisans and menial duties were deleted. 

In 2003, the Princess Grace Challenge Cup was launched as an event for women's quadruple sculls both in recognition of John B. Kelly and in memory of his daughter, Grace.

Kelly was surprised that his entry was rejected. Kelly always maintained that he had been assured by United States rowing officials that his entry would be accepted. In the 1950s he wrote to Jack Beresford, the winner of the 1920 Henley Diamond Sculls race, the following:

 "Russell Johnson, secretary of the NAAO [the governing board for U.S. rowing] had an arrangement with the Henley officials that they would approve all entries from the United States, which he had made during his visit to England in the winter of 1919–20... I asked him to check with the Stewards to see if they would accept my entry because in my earlier days I had served an apprenticeship as a bricklayer. He contacted four of them and they told him to send my entry in; the war had changed the old rule and everything would be all right".
This led Kelly to seek and gain redemption by going to the 1920 Summer Olympics in Antwerp, Belgium, which he had originally not planned to attend.

Redemption at the 1920 Olympics
When he first made his application to race at Henley, Kelly told the press that if his entry was accepted, he would go to Henley and most likely would skip the Olympics. On learning of his rejection, Kelly was surprised and angered and stated: "I had made all the arrangements to sail for England ... I'll go to the Olympics now for sure. I want to get a crack at the man who wins the diamond sculls."

Kelly soon had his chance, representing the United States at the 1920 Summer Olympics in Antwerp, Belgium. In a hard-fought race, he won the single scull event, extracting a measure of revenge by defeating the winner of the Diamond Sculls, British sculler Jack Beresford. Beresford was one of the most talented oarsmen of the day and would go on to win medals at five Olympics. The race, one of the closest in Olympic history, featured a dramatic duel down the stretch with Kelly winning by a second. Kelly and Beresford would go on to become good friends. Half an hour after the singles final, Kelly teamed with his cousin Paul Costello to win the double scull (2x) race, a feat which has never been repeated at the Olympic games. After his Olympic victory, Kelly purportedly mailed his racing cap to King George V with the note, "Greetings from a bricklayer", for having been snubbed at Henley.

Repeat at the 1924 Olympics
In 1924, Kelly and Costello repeated their success, winning the double-scull event at the Summer Olympics in Paris. This made Kelly the first rower to win three Olympic gold medals and one of the most famous and successful athletes of his generation.

Personal life

After a long courtship, Kelly married Margaret Katherine Majer (1898–1990) in 1924, daughter of German immigrants. Well known herself in the world of sports, she was the founder of Women's sports in the University of Pennsylvania. Majer's family was Lutheran and she converted to Catholicism prior to the marriage. They had four children: Margaret "Peggy" Katherine (1925–1991), John "Kell" Brendan Jr. (1927–1985), Grace Patricia (1929–1982) and Elizabeth "Lizanne" Anne (1933–2009).
 
John B. Kelly Jr. won the Diamond Sculls at Henley in 1947 and 1949. Jack Jr., as he was also known, won the James E. Sullivan Award as the best amateur athlete in the U.S. in 1947 for his accomplishments. He would go on to represent the United States at the 1948, 1952, 1956 and 1960 Olympic Games. Jack Jr. won the bronze medal in the single scull at the 1956 Olympics and  continue to be involved in amateur sports, eventually being appointed President of the United States Olympic Committee shortly before his sudden death from a heart attack in 1985.

Kelly's daughter Grace was an Academy Award-winning actress who became Princess consort of Monaco when she married Prince Rainier in 1956. Kelly purportedly gave Prince Rainier a $2 million dowry for his daughter's marriage. Kelly is the maternal grandfather of Albert II, the reigning prince of Monaco. When Grace's engagement to Prince Rainier was announced, Kelly quipped: "I told the Prince that royalty didn't mean that much to us, and that I hoped he wouldn't run around the way some Princes do."
Kelly was the model for the character of George Kittredge, Tracy Lord's brash, up-and-coming, man-of-the-people fiancé, in Philip Barry's 1939 Broadway comedy The Philadelphia Story. Grace Kelly played Tracy Lord in the 1956 Cole Porter movie musical version, High Society. Grace visited her grandfather's cottage, the Kelly homestead, near Newport, County Mayo during her 1961 state visit to Ireland.

Later life

Kelly was actively involved in city politics, including chairmanship of the Philadelphia County Democratic Party in 1937 and ran for mayor of Philadelphia in 1935. At the time, Philadelphia was a heavily Republican city, but he came close to winning, losing by fewer than 50,000 votes compared with the usual margin of 300,000. From January 1936 until June 1937, Kelly served as Pennsylvania secretary of revenue under Governor George Howard Earle III.

He was a commissioner and later president of the Fairmount Park Commission, which administered Fairmount Park in Philadelphia, one of the largest municipal parks in the world. In 1941, President Roosevelt named the still popular Kelly as the National Physical Fitness Director, a post he held throughout World War II. Kelly was a strong advocate for physical fitness for all Americans, and in particular those inducted into the military.

Kelly was Commodore of the Schuylkill Navy from 1935 to 1940, and was president of the NAAO, the then governing board for U.S. rowing, from 1954 through 1955. Kelly is the only rower who is a member of the U.S. Olympic Hall of Fame. He is also a member of the United States Rowing Hall of Fame, having been elected in 1956 at the same time as his son Jack Jr.

Kelly died of intestinal cancer at his home in Philadelphia, age 70. He was interred at Holy Sepulchre Cemetery in Cheltenham, Pennsylvania.

In 1967, Philadelphia erected a prominent statue of Kelly by artist Harry Rosin near the finish line of the Schuylkill River course that Kelly rowed. It is located just off of the scenic Kelly Drive, which is named for Kelly's son, Jack Jr. Every year, USRowing, as the governing board is now known, bestows the Jack Kelly Award on an individual who represents the ideals that Kelly exemplified, including superior achievement in rowing, service to amateur athletics and success in their chosen profession.

Achievements and awards

 Gold Medal, Single Scull, 1920 Olympic Games
 Gold Medal, Double Scull, 1920 Olympic Games
 Gold Medal, Double Scull, 1924 Olympic Games
 126 consecutive victories in the single scull
 Member, United States Olympic Hall of Fame
 Member, United States Rowing Hall of Fame, Single Scull (elected 1956 at the same time as his son, Jack Jr.)
 Member, United States Rowing Hall of Fame, Double Scull (elected 1956)
 National Physical Fitness Director (World War II)
 Member Philadelphia Sports Hall of Fame, (elected in the charter class of 2003 with Wilt Chamberlain, Joe Frazier, Jimmie Foxx, et al.)

References

External links

 
 Schuylkill Navy site on Kelly, et al.
 Time Magazine Obituary
 Article on Kelly Sr. and Kelly Jr.
 Kelly Statue
 Kelly Statue
 Holmesburg Athletic Club Philadelphia Athletic Champs 1919 & 1920
 

1889 births
1960 deaths
United States Army personnel of World War I
American bricklayers
American people of Irish descent
Burials at Holy Sepulchre Cemetery
Catholics from Pennsylvania
Deaths from cancer in Pennsylvania
Deaths from colorectal cancer
Kelly family
Olympic gold medalists for the United States in rowing
Rowers from Philadelphia
Rowers at the 1920 Summer Olympics
Rowers at the 1924 Summer Olympics
United States Army officers
United States Army soldiers
Holmesburg Athletic Club players
American male rowers
Medalists at the 1920 Summer Olympics
Medalists at the 1924 Summer Olympics
People associated with the Philadelphia Museum of Art
Pennsylvania Democrats
Military personnel from Philadelphia